Väsby IK HK is the ice hockey department of the sports club Väsby IK. Since the 2021–22 season the club is back in the third tier, Hockeyettan, having been relegated from HockeyAllsvenskan after losing to Kristianstads IK in the 2020–21 Play Out series, ending a one-year stint in HockeyAllsvenskan.

At the end of the 1986–87 season, Väsby achieved one of the greatest upsets in the history of Swedish hockey by achieving promotion to the top division of Swedish ice hockey. The team's time in the top league would be short however, as the team finished last in the first round of the following year's Elitserien season and were sent down to the Allsvenskan spring series after Christmas, where they failed to re-qualify for the following Elitserien season and were ultimately relegated to the second tier league. They were granted promotion to the second-tier league HockeyAllsvenskan for the 2020–21 season, after Karlskrona HK was relegated due to that club's financial struggles.

Season-by-season

References

External links
Väsby IK HK's official site
Väsby IK HK's hockey club profile on Eliteprospects.com

Ice hockey teams in Sweden
Ice hockey teams in Stockholm County